Bustillo de Chaves is a municipality located in the province of Valladolid, Castile and León, Spain. According to the 2004 census (INE), the municipality has a population of 102 inhabitants, and in 2012 it had 79 residents.

The village sits along the Navajos river.

References

Municipalities in the Province of Valladolid